"WOW" is the title of Ruslana's single released on 17 April 2011 in Ukraine. The track was produced in Los Angeles by producer Jack Spade.

The song was written by Ruslana with Alexander Ksenofontov (TFC band leader and the singer's husband) and Vlad DeBriansky (Jack Spade, TFC band lead guitar). The feature of the single was the part of the "March Chernomor" from Glinka's opera Ruslan and Ludmila - one of the most popular and recognizable Slavic motive in the world.

Music video
The shooting took place on the Kyiv Lenin Smithy ship building plant. The music video was directed by Semen Gorov (Ukraine). Director of photography was Brandon Cox, who has worked with Eminem, Jessica Alba, T-Pain, Chris Brown, Lil Mama, and Linkin Park.

Charts

References

Ruslana songs
2011 singles
2011 songs
Songs written by Ruslana